A prime reciprocal magic square is a magic square using the decimal digits of the reciprocal of a prime number.

Consider a unit fraction, like 1/3 or 1/7. In base ten, the remainder, and so the digits, of 1/3 repeats at once: 0.3333... . However, the remainders of 1/7 repeat over six, or 7−1, digits: 1/7 = 0·142857142857142857... If you examine the multiples of 1/7, you can see that each is a cyclic permutation of these six digits:

 1/7 = 0·1 4 2 8 5 7...
 2/7 = 0·2 8 5 7 1 4...
 3/7 = 0·4 2 8 5 7 1...
 4/7 = 0·5 7 1 4 2 8...
 5/7 = 0·7 1 4 2 8 5...
 6/7 = 0·8 5 7 1 4 2...

If the digits are laid out as a square, each row will sum to 1+4+2+8+5+7, or 27, and only slightly less obvious that each column will also do so, and consequently we have a magic square:

 1 4 2 8 5 7
 2 8 5 7 1 4
 4 2 8 5 7 1
 5 7 1 4 2 8
 7 1 4 2 8 5
 8 5 7 1 4 2

However, neither diagonal sums to 27, but all other prime reciprocals in base ten with maximum period of p−1 produce squares in which all rows and columns sum to the same total.

Other properties of prime reciprocals: Midy's theorem

The repeating pattern of an even number of digits [7-1, 11-1, 13-1, 17-1, 19-1, 23-1, 29-1, 47-1, 59-1, 61-1, 73-1, 89-1, 97-1, 101-1, ...] in the quotients when broken in half are the nines-complement of each half:

 1/7 = 0.142,857,142,857 ...
      +0.857,142
       ---------
       0.999,999

 1/11 = 0.09090,90909 ...
       +0.90909,09090
        -----
        0.99999,99999

 1/13 = 0.076,923 076,923 ...
       +0.923,076
        ---------
        0.999,999

 1/17 = 0.05882352,94117647
       +0.94117647,05882352
       -------------------
        0.99999999,99999999

 1/19 = 0.052631578,947368421 ...
       +0.947368421,052631578
        ----------------------
        0.999999999,999999999

Ekidhikena Purvena  From: Bharati Krishna Tirtha's Vedic mathematics#By one more than the one before

Concerning the number of decimal places shifted in the quotient per multiple of 1/19:

 01/19 = 0.052631578,947368421
 02/19 = 0.1052631578,94736842
 04/19 = 0.21052631578,9473684
 08/19 = 0.421052631578,947368
 16/19 = 0.8421052631578,94736

A factor of 2 in the numerator produces a shift of one decimal place to the right in the quotient.

 In the square from 1/19, with maximum period 18 and row-and-column total of 81, 
 both diagonals also sum to 81, and this square is therefore fully magic:

 01/19 = 0·0 5 2 6 3 1 5 7 8 9 4 7 3 6 8 4 2 1...
 02/19 = 0·1 0 5 2 6 3 1 5 7 8 9 4 7 3 6 8 4 2...
 03/19 = 0·1 5 7 8 9 4 7 3 6 8 4 2 1 0 5 2 6 3...
 04/19 = 0·2 1 0 5 2 6 3 1 5 7 8 9 4 7 3 6 8 4...
 05/19 = 0·2 6 3 1 5 7 8 9 4 7 3 6 8 4 2 1 0 5...
 06/19 = 0·3 1 5 7 8 9 4 7 3 6 8 4 2 1 0 5 2 6...
 07/19 = 0·3 6 8 4 2 1 0 5 2 6 3 1 5 7 8 9 4 7...
 08/19 = 0·4 2 1 0 5 2 6 3 1 5 7 8 9 4 7 3 6 8...
 09/19 = 0·4 7 3 6 8 4 2 1 0 5 2 6 3 1 5 7 8 9...
 10/19 = 0·5 2 6 3 1 5 7 8 9 4 7 3 6 8 4 2 1 0...
 11/19 = 0·5 7 8 9 4 7 3 6 8 4 2 1 0 5 2 6 3 1...
 12/19 = 0·6 3 1 5 7 8 9 4 7 3 6 8 4 2 1 0 5 2...
 13/19 = 0·6 8 4 2 1 0 5 2 6 3 1 5 7 8 9 4 7 3...
 14/19 = 0·7 3 6 8 4 2 1 0 5 2 6 3 1 5 7 8 9 4...
 15/19 = 0·7 8 9 4 7 3 6 8 4 2 1 0 5 2 6 3 1 5...
 16/19 = 0·8 4 2 1 0 5 2 6 3 1 5 7 8 9 4 7 3 6...
 17/19 = 0·8 9 4 7 3 6 8 4 2 1 0 5 2 6 3 1 5 7...
 18/19 = 0·9 4 7 3 6 8 4 2 1 0 5 2 6 3 1 5 7 8...

The same phenomenon occurs with other primes in other bases, and the following table lists some of them, giving the prime, base, and magic total (derived from the formula base−1 × prime−1 / 2):

See also
Cyclic number

References
Rademacher, H. and Toeplitz, O. The Enjoyment of Mathematics: Selections from Mathematics for the Amateur. Princeton, NJ: Princeton University Press, pp. 158–160, 1957.

Weisstein, Eric W. "Midy's Theorem." From MathWorld—A Wolfram Web Resource. http://mathworld.wolfram.com/MidysTheorem.html

Recreational mathematics
Magic squares